Ribonuclease pancreatic is an enzyme that in humans is encoded by the RNASE1 gene.

Function 

This gene encodes a member of the pancreatic-type of secretory ribonucleases, a subset of the ribonuclease A super-family. The encoded endonuclease cleaves internal phosphodiester RNA bonds on the 3'-side of pyrimidine bases. It prefers poly(C) as a substrate and hydrolyses 2',3'-cyclic nucleotides, with a pH optimum near 8.0. The encoded protein is monomeric and more commonly acts to degrade ss-RNA over ds-RNA. Alternative splicing occurs at this locus and four transcript variants encoding the same protein have been identified.

References

Further reading

External links 
 PDBe-KB provides an overview of all the structure information available in the PDB for Human Ribonuclease pancreatic